Boyd Lagoon is a lagoon in the Gibson Desert of Western Australia, to the northwest of Tjirrkarli Community and to the southwest of Lake Breaden.

See also

 List of lakes of Western Australia

References

Lagoons of Australia
Lakes of Goldfields-Esperance (Western Australia)